Founded in 1938, the Estonian Academy of Sciences is Estonia's national academy of science in Tallinn.  As with other national academies, it is an independent group of well-known scientists whose stated aim is to promote research and development, encourage international scientific cooperation, and disseminate knowledge to the public.  As of March 2017, it had 77 full members and 20 foreign members.  Since 15 October 2014, the president of the Academy is the mathematician Tarmo Soomere.

Divisions
The Academy has four divisions:
 Division of Astronomy and Physics (Estonian: Astronoomia ja füüsika osakond)
 Division of Informatics and Engineering (Estonian: Informaatika ja tehnikateaduste osakond)
 Division of Biology, Geology and Chemistry (Estonian: Bioloogia, geoloogia ja keemia osakond)
 Division of the Humanities and Social Sciences (Estonian: Humanitaar- ja sotsiaalteaduste osakond)

History
The Academy was established in 1938 as a learned society.  When Estonia was occupied by the Soviet Union the Academy was dissolved on July 17, 1940.  In June 1945 it was reestablished as the Academy of Sciences of the Estonian SSR.  In Soviet times, it consisted of a central library and four divisions containing 15 research institutes as well as other scientific societies and museums. In April 1989, shortly before Estonian independence, the academy regained its original name of Estonian Academy of Sciences.  At this time it was also restructured into its present form.Kronoloogia, web page at  the Estonian Academy of Sciences.  Accessed on line September 12, 2007.

Presidents
 1946–1950 Hans Kruus
 1950–1968 Johan Eichfeld
 1968–1973 Arnold Veimer
 1973–1990 Karl Rebane
 1990–1994 Arno Köörna
 1994–2004 Jüri Engelbrecht
 2004–2014 Richard Villems
 since 2014 Tarmo Soomere

Prizes

The Academy's most prestigious prize is the Medal of the Estonian Academy of Sciences''. This is awarded "for outstanding services in development of Estonian science or in helping forward its development, as well as for services in performance of tasks of the Estonian Academy of Sciences."

Location
The Academy is located on Kohtu Street in Tallinn.  Its building is the so-called palace of Ungern-Sternberg, built in 1865 by the architect Martin Gropius.

Estonian Academy Publishers
At the academy, the Estonian Academy Publishers is located. As of 2021 the publisher publishes seven journals:
 Proceedings of the Estonian Academy of Sciences
 Estonian Journal of Earth Sciences
 Oil Shale
 Linguistica Uralica
 Trames
 Estonian Journal of Archaeology
 Acta Historica Tallinnensia

In addition, the publisher publishes The Yearbook of the Estonian Mother Tongue Society.

The publisher published the following journals:
 Estonian Journal of Ecology
 Estonian Journal of Engineering
 Proceedings of the Estonian Academy of Sciences. Geology
 Proceedings of the Estonian Academy of Sciences. Chemistry
 Proceedings of the Estonian Academy of Sciences. Physics. Mathematics

Associated organizations
Several organizations are associated with the Academy.
These institutions or societies have activities and goals that conform to the objectives of the academy.
They include:

Estonian Naturalists' Society 
Estonian Geographical Society
Society of Estonian Regional Studies
Estonian Mother Tongue Society
Estonian Union of the History and Philosophy of Science
Estonian Learned Society in Sweden 
Estonian Literary Society
Learned Estonian Society 
Estonian Musicological Society 
Estonian Physical Society 
Estonian Association of Engineers   
Estonian Biochemical Society
Estonian Semiotics Association
Estonian Chemical Society
Estonian Society of Human Genetics
Estonian Society for Economics
Estonian Society for the Study of Religions

The press is also a member of the Association of European University Presses.

References

External links
 

Scientific organizations established in 1938
1938 establishments in Estonia
National academies of sciences
National academies of arts and humanities
Science and technology in Estonia
USSR Academy of Sciences
Members of the International Council for Science
Members of the International Science Council